Wangheungsa Temple (王興寺, "Monastery of royal propagation") was the national temple of the Korean kingdom of Baekje. Its construction was begun in 599 under the reign of King Beop and completed under his son and successor, King Mu, in 634.

References
Jonathan W. Best, “King Mu and the Making and Meanings of Miruksa,” in Korean Religions in Practice, edited by Robert Buswell (Princeton: Princeton University Press, 2007), 35–50.

Temples in Korea
Religion in Baekje
Religious buildings and structures completed in 599